The 2012 Etihad Airways Abu Dhabi (V8) Grand Prix was a motor race for the Australian sedan-based V8 Supercars racing cars. It was the thirteenth event of the 2012 International V8 Supercars Championship. It was held on the weekend of 2–4 November at the Yas Marina Circuit in Abu Dhabi, United Arab Emirates.

The event was the main support category for the Formula One Abu Dhabi Grand Prix. Holden driver Jamie Whincup dominated the weekend, winning all three races, after Ford driver Will Davison took all three pole positions.

Results

Race 24

Qualifying

Race

Race 25

Race

Race 26

Race

Standings
 After 26 of 30 races.

References

External links
Official series website

Yas Marina
Yas Marina
Motorsport competitions in the United Arab Emirates